Phibunsongkhram Province was a province of Thailand that existed between 1941 and 1946. It was created as a result of the annexation of Cambodian territory by Thailand following the 1940-41 Franco-Thai war. The province was named after Plaek Phibunsongkhram, prime minister of Thailand at the time. The province was dissolved and returned to France in 1946.

History
The province was formed in 1941 after France ceded Siem Reap (excluding Siem Reap town and the Angkor Wat ruins ), Oddar Meanchey and Banteay Meanchey provinces to Thailand as a result of the Franco-Thai war. The province was dissolved in 1946 and returned to France after the post-war French government threatened to veto Thailand's entry into the UN.

Administrative divisions
Phibunsongkhram was divided into six districts (amphoe):

See also 
 Japanese occupation of Cambodia
 Nakhon Champassak Province
 Phra Tabong Province
 Franco-Thai War
 Thailand in World War II

References

External links
The Land Boundaries of Indochina: Cambodia, Laos and Vietnam
Cambodia – Thailand Boundary

Former provinces of Thailand
1940s in Cambodia